Stuck in the Library is Brooklyn College's arts and literary magazine. Published quarterly, the magazine features the writings and artwork of Brooklyn College students and others in the community. The magazine is available free of charge at locations on the Brooklyn College campus.

Leadership
Founded in March 2013 by Yaakov Bressler, the literary group had a modest beginning, consisting of a dozen or so writers meeting every month for literary and writing events. As the magazine's readers and contributors grew, the magazine took initiative to expand its funding, running a successful referendum campaign in April 2014 – expanding the magazine's budget "from hundreds to thousands."

In 2015, Paulette Gindi became Stuck in the Library's second president, dedicating her term to providing "A Safe and Creative Space at Brooklyn College."  The group under Ms. Gindi's leadership succeeding in publishing the magazine's 30th edition in October 2017.

In 2018, Mary Halabani became Stuck in the Library's third president and succeeded in further expanding the literary group's operations to Brooklyn College and CUNY students.

Mission
According to their website:

See also
List of literary magazines

References

External links
http://www.stuckinthelibrary.org

Literary magazines published in the United States
Magazines published in New York (state)
2013 establishments in New York City